Melisa "Melai" Bunayog Cantiveros-Francisco (born April 6, 1988) is a Filipino actress, comedian, and host. She came to prominence in 2009, after winning Pinoy Big Brother: Double Up. In 2015, she won the first season of the Filipino version of Your Face Sounds Familiar. She is currently one of ABS-CBN's contract talents. She currently hosts a morning talk show, Magandang Buhay, alongside Karla Estrada who left in 2022 and Jolina Magdangal.

Personal life
Melai Cantiveros was born in General Santos, Philippines, to Dionisio and Virginia Cantiveros. She is the third of four siblings and the only daughter. She studied at Mindanao State University–General Santos. In the university, she was an activist and a member of a social democratic party. On the September 8, 2013, episode of The Buzz, she revealed in an interview with Boy Abunda that she is getting married with Jason Francisco on December 9, 2013, and was pregnant with their first child. Their daughter was born in General Santos. On July 26, 2016, however, she and Francisco confirmed their separation from their marriage of almost three years through their daughter's Instagram. They have since reconciled, and at the same time, announced that they are expecting a second child. She has since given birth to a second child.

Career
In October 2009, Cantiveros entered the Big Brother house along with 25 other housemates. After 133 days, she was able to garner enough votes to reach the final episode wherein she won the competition by getting 1,226,675 votes or 32.08% of the entire votes.

In February 2010, Cantiveros did guesting in several talk shows like The Buzz, SNN: Showbiz News Ngayon, and Entertainment Live. She was also invited to variety shows such as ASAP ROCKS. She and her real life partner, Jason Francisco, starred in a reality show spin off entitled Melason In Love.

Cantiveros was also cast in the daytime drama Impostor. She also landed a main role in the fantaserye show, Kokey @ Ako. She also played a main role in Maalaala Mo Kaya as a maid named Pangga. She became one of the hosts on the now defunct noon time show Happy, Yipee, Yehey. She also played a main role as Brandy De la Paz in Precious Hearts Romances Presents: Mana Po before the show ended in late March.      
                                 
In February 2015, Cantiveros is the one of the contestants and the winner of Your Face Sounds Familiar.

Filmography

Television

Film

Awards and nominations

Notes

References

External links
 

1988 births
Living people
People from General Santos
Visayan people
Filipino film actresses
Filipino Roman Catholics
Filipino television actresses
Filipino women comedians
Pinoy Big Brother contestants
Big Brother (franchise) winners
Your Face Sounds Familiar winners
Star Magic
ABS-CBN personalities